La costanza della ragione is a 1964 drama film  directed by  Pasquale Festa Campanile, based on the homonymous novel by Vasco Pratolini and starring Sami Frey and Catherine Deneuve.

Plot
Bruno, a young idealist, would like to be hired in a large company. His extremism hampers his intent. He falls in love with Lori, but after her death he discovers he has been betrayed. Bruno then rethinks to his orientation. After the age of feeling, now comes the age of reason. Therefore you will get the desired job by compromising.

Cast
Sami Frey as Bruno
Catherine Deneuve as Lori
Enrico Maria Salerno as Millo
 Norma Bengell as Ivana
 Andrea Checchi as Lori's father  
 Sergio Tofano as don Bonifazi
 Glauco Mauri as  Luigi
 Valeria Moriconi as  Judith
 Lia Angeleri as  Lori's stepmother
 Carlo Palmucci as  Giorgio

Production
Produced by Pasquale Festa Campanile and Massimo Franciosa for Franca Film (Rome), in co-production with S.N.D.C. of Paris, the film was shot in the summer of 1964 for the exteriors in Tuscany and for the interiors in the Studies of the SAFA Palatino, to go out in theaters in the first screening on 27 November 1964. First Italian film for Catherine Deneuve and Samy Frey.

References

External links 
 
 Viareggio effetto cinema: la Versilia e il grande schermo dai Fratelli Lumière ai giorni nostri

Films based on Italian novels
Italian drama films
1964 drama films
1964 films
Films directed by Pasquale Festa Campanile
1960s Italian films